Jennifer Riria, is a Kenyan businesswoman, corporate executive, banker, and academic who serves as the group chief executive officer of Kenya Women Holding Group, a microfinance, banking and insurance group serving nearly one million mostly rural Kenyan women.

Background and education
Riria was born in Kenya. She was the fourth-born in a family with 10 children.

She was admitted to Precious Blood High School, an all-girls boarding school administered by the religious order of the Sisters of the Precious Blood, located in Nairobi, Kenya's capital and largest city. At the end of high school, Riria became pregnant.

After giving birth, she went on to study at the University of Dar es Salaam on a scholarship. She graduated with a Bachelor of Arts degree in Education. She then earned a Master of Arts degree in Education Administration from the University of Leeds in the United Kingdom. Later, Riria obtained a Doctor of Philosophy in Women's Education and Development, from Kenyatta University.

Career
Following her first degree, Riria taught at Kabete Technical Institute for six months followed by one year at State House Girls High School. In 1979, after her second degree, she returned to her native Kenya and registered for her Doctorate degree at the Kenyatta University. She also began lecturing, part-time at the same university.

In 1991, she joined Kenya Women Finance Trust (KWFT), a microfinance financial institution, founded in 1982. As at 1991, when Riria arrived KWFT was in bad shape, understaffed, and losing money. Riria worked as CEO, janitor, accountant, loan officer and receptionist. Her efforts began to bear fruit and the institution stabilized. In 2010, the institution was split into Kenya Women Microfinance Bank and Kenya Women Holding Limited. The holding company then re-branded to Echo Network Africa Limited, in February 2018. Riria is the incumbent CEO of the holding company.

Other considerations
Dr. Jennifer Riria was the winner of the Ernst & Young World Entrepreneur of the Year Award, or Kenya in 2014. She is also serves as chairwoman of Women's World Banking, a global microfinance network consisting of over 53 MFIs from 30 countries. Riria is a supporter and promoter of the Educate the Net 235 Girls programme. The initiative supports needy girls in their education.

She has served on the boards of Kenyan and international organizations, including at the Nairobi Stock Exchange, being the first female to serve in that capacity. She has also served on the boards of Jitegemee Trust Limited, a microfinance company, National Bank of Kenya, and Kenya Post Office Savings Bank.

Jennifer Riria is the author of two books; an autobiography and A History of Higher Education in Kenya. Both books were launched in June 2014.

See also

References

External links
The trouble with Kenyan universities As at 5 June 2014.
Meet the Boss: Jennifer Riria, CEO, Kenya Women Holding
https://www.linkedin.com/in/jennifer-nkuene-riria-44996a6a?originalSubdomain=ke

Living people
1950s births
University of Dar es Salaam alumni
Alumni of the University of Leeds
Kenyatta University alumni
21st-century Kenyan businesswomen
21st-century Kenyan businesspeople
20th-century Kenyan businesswomen
20th-century Kenyan businesspeople
Kenyan business executives
Academic staff of Kenyatta University